Mr. Belt & Wezol are a Dutch electronic music duo consisting of DJs and producers Bart Riem and Sam van Wees. The duo's tracks "Finally" and "Somebody to Love" (2015) reached the top 10 of Beatport for several weeks. In 2016 the duo won the "Breakthrough Artist of the Year" award at the Annual International Dance Music Award.

History
Since 2014, Mr. Belt & Wezol run a monthly podcast. It started under the name "Mr. Belt & Wezol Music Club" and continues as "Thee Cuckoo's Nest". In 2014, the duo permed in Club Unit in Herentals, Belgium.

In 2016 at Belt & Wezol performed at "Wish Outdoor" in Beek en Donk, the Dance Nature Festival in Eindhoven, and not live at the Weekend Festival in Stockholm and at the Weekend Festival Baltic in Pärnu, Estonia. In 2017, they performed in the Indian Summer Festival of Langedijk, in Wish Outdoor, the Lakedance  Festival in Best, and the Summer Festival of Antwerp. In 2018 they could be seen and heard at Deephouse stages in Amsterdam, Groningen, and Oldenzaal. In 2019 Mr Belt & Wezol performed at the festivals Sneeuwbal in Utrecht, Paaspop in Schijndel, "We Are Electric" in Eersel and again at Wish Outdoor.

Awards
2016: Annual International Dance Music Award in the category best break-through artist (group)

Discography

Extended plays 
 2014: Slow Me Down
 2014: Atlas / Miracle [Love Not Money Records]

Singles 
 2013: Homeless
 2014: The One
 2014: Lone
 2014: Toys
 2014: Sneak
 2014: Luv Thang
 2014: Cheater
 2014: Small Rooms (with De Hofnar)
 2014: Shiver [Spinnin' Records]
 2014: Feel So Good [Musical Freedom]
 2014: Pikachu (with Oliver Heldens) [Spinnin' Records]
 2014: Time [Spinnin' Deep]
 2015: Homeless
 2015: Finally [Spinnin' Deep]
 2015: Somebody to Love (with Freejak) [Spinnin' Deep]
 2015: RDY2FLY [Spinnin' Deep]
 2016: Faith (with Daser) [Potion]
 2016: Hide & Seek (with Shermanology) [Heldeep Records]
 2016: Stand Up
 2017: Boogie Wonderland [Spinnin' Records]
 2017: Take Me Higher [Future House Music]
 2017: Good Times [Spinnin' Deep]
 2017: One More Day (with Aevion) [SPRS]
 2018: Let's All Chant [Spinnin']
 2018: Stupid (with LucyXX) [Spinnin']
 2018: Harmony [Heldeep Records]
 2019: The Rhythm [Spinnin' Records]
 2019: One Thing (with Jack Wins) [Spinnin' Records]
 2019: Mind Control [Armada Music]
 2019: Do It for Love (featuring Sander Nijbroek) [Spinnin' Records]
 2019: Not Dancing [Spinnin' Records]
 2020: The Jabberwock [Heldeep Records]
 2020: Homeless [Spinnin' Records]
 2021: Way It Is [Spinnin' Records]

Remixes 
 2014: Too Much (Drake, Sampha)
 2014: Renegade Master (Wildchild)
 2014: New Orleans (Naxxos) [Spinnin' Deep]
 2014: Guitar Track (Sander van Doorn & Firebeatz)
 2014: Gecko (Overdrive) (Oliver Heldens & Becky Hill) [FFRR]
 2014: Cool Enough (Spada & Elen Levon) [Ego]
 2015: Sometimes (Alle Farben & Graham Candy)
 2015: Till It Hurts (Yellow Claw ft. Ayden) [Spinnin' Records]
 2015: Raindrops (SNBRN ft. Kerli) [Ultra Music]
 2015: We Like To Party (Showtek)
 2015: The Party (Joe Stone ft. Montell Jordan) [Spinnin' Records]
 2015: New Love (The Arches) [Potion]
 2015: Never Forget You (MNEK & Zara Larsson) [Digital Teddy Ltd]
 2016: Hold On (MOGUAI ft. Cheat Codes) [Spinnin' Remixes]
 2016: Sparks (Gramercy ft. Sharna Bass) [Armada Music]
 2017: Katchi (Ofenbach vs. Nick Waterhouse) [WEA France]
 2017: Back for More (Feder ft. Daecolm)
 2018: Crazy (Lost Frequencies & Zonderling) [Found Frequencies]
 2018: Talk To Me (GoldFish)  [Armada]

References

External links 
 Mr. Belt & Wezol Discography at Discogs
 Mr. Belt & Wezol Official Soundcloud at SoundCloud
 Interview at DMC World Magazine

Dutch DJs
Dutch musical duos
Dutch house music groups
People from Delft